John Thomas Reid Price (November 13, 1912 – October 2, 1967) was a Major League Baseball shortstop who played in seven games for the Cleveland Indians during the 1946 Cleveland Indians season. 

He was known for delighting fans with his skills – such as batting while hanging upside-down or throwing three balls to three different players in one movement – and was dubbed "the Clown Prince of Baseball" for his other antics, which also included releasing a pair of five-foot boa constrictors on board a train. 

Price briefly teamed up with Max Patkin, another baseball clown; together they were described by Boston Red Sox manager Lou Boudreau as the "funniest show I ever saw".

On October 2, 1967, Price committed suicide by hanging himself.

References

External links

1912 births
1967 suicides
Major League Baseball shortstops
Cleveland Indians players
Baseball players from Mississippi
People from Benton County, Mississippi
Suicides by hanging in California
Union City Greyhounds players